The National Sports Development Fund-Sports Authority of Thailand (NSDF-SAT) Park (Thai: สวนกองทุนพัฒนาการกีฬาแห่งชาติ การกีฬาแห่งประเทศไทย) is a park in Bangkok, Thailand. The NSDF-SAT Park features an elevated "green mile" walkway that links Lumpini and Benjakitti parks. The park features a fitness center, public restrooms, and storage.

References 
Parks in Bangkok

Thailand geography stubs